Smith Creek is a stream in Woodbridge Township, New Jersey, United States, emptying into the Arthur Kill  north of the Woodbridge River. It was named for John Smith, one of the group who in 1667 purchased the land parcel from Governor Philip Carteret that became Woodbridge. Dredging of the creek in the region of the marinas was a 2013 priority for Woodbridge Township after Hurricane Sandy. The creek is a "minor freshwater tributary" to Arthur Kill, with higher flows in the spring, and less in late summer and fall. One mile north of the mouth is an oil refining and storage facility. In 2013 "corrective action" was taken against the  Hess Corporation, after selling the property, for soil and groundwater contamination, including arsenic, lead and benzene. An old reference states: Transatlantic sailing vessels once docked in Woodbridge, but silt from the clay pits converted Smith Creek into an inconsequential brook. Until the 1880s Woodbridge was a fashionable watering place. The Arthur Kill is now so spoiled by oil and sewage even gulls avoid it.

References

Bodies of water in Woodbridge Township, New Jersey
Rivers of Middlesex County, New Jersey
Rivers of New Jersey